The Other Side is a children's picture book written by Jacqueline Woodson and illustrated by E. B. Lewis, published in 2001 by G. P. Putnam's Sons. In 2012, the book was adapted into a film by Weston Woods Studios, Inc., narrated by the author's daughter, Toshi Widoff-Woodson.

Summary
The narrator and protagonist of the story is Clover, a young African-American girl. She lives beside a fence which segregates her town. Her mother instructs her never to climb over to the other side. Then one summer, she notices a white girl on the other side of the fence. The girl seems to be very lonely and is even outside when it is raining.

Clover decides to talk to the girl on the other side of the fence. Both girls are not allowed to cross the fence, so they simply decide to sit on the fence together. First, Clover's friends will not let Annie, the girl from the other side, play with them but then all of the girls realize that the fence (a symbol separating the whites and blacks) should not be there.

Awards
ALA Notable Book
SLJ Best Book of the Year
Booklist Editor’s Choice
2001 Time of Wonder Award
IRA Teacher’s Choices 2002
2004 Louisiana Young Reader’s Choice Award (Honor)
California Young Reader Medal Nominee
2003-2004 South Carolina Book Award Nominee

2001 children's books
American picture books
Children's fiction books
Literature by African-American women